The Battle of Dongola may refer to one of a series of military conflicts including:
 The First Battle of Dongola between the Kingdom of Makuria and the Rashidun Caliphate led by Commander Uqbah ibn Nafae in 642.
 The Second Battle of Dongola between the Kingdom of Makuria under King Qaladurut and the Rashidun Caliphate led by Commander Abdullah ibn Sa'ad in 652.